The , abbreviated as , is a private university of Technology in Japan, with campuses located in Tokyo and Saitama. Established in 1927 as the Tokyo Higher School of Industry and Commerce, it was chartered as a university in 1949.

The Shibaura Institute of Technology enjoys a moderately high reputation nationally, ranking 26th in the 2017 edition of Truly Strong Universities, 28th in Times Higher Education Japan University rankings for 2022 (out of 775 institutions), and joint 6th among private universities in terms of entry difficulty (in STEM). While the average acceptance rate is in the region of 20-30%, the applicants per place ratio approaches or exceeds 20:1 in some departments. Shibaura is the only private technology university in Japan to have been selected for the Top Global University Project.

Organization

Campuses 
Shibaura Institute of Technology's main campus is located in the Toyosu district of Kōtō, Tokyo. The nearest station is Toyosu Station.

Apart from the main campus in Toyosu, there are 2 other campuses. The Omiya Campus in Saitama, Saitama, and the Shibaura Campus in Minato, Tokyo.
All undergraduates spend the first 2 years at the Omiya Campus, then move to a different campus depending on their major.
Students of the College of Systems Engineering and Science will spend all 4 years at the Omiya Campus.

Undergraduate schools 
 College of Engineering
 Department of Mechanical Engineering 
 Department of Engineering Science and Mechanics 
 Department of Materials Science and Engineering 
 Department of Applied Chemistry 
 Department of Electrical Engineering 
 Department of Electronic Engineering
 Department of Communications Engineering 
 Department of Information Science and Engineering 
 Department of Civil Engineering 
 Department of Architecture 
 Department of Architecture and Building
 College of Systems Engineering and Science
 Department of Electronic Information Systems 
 Department of Machinery and Control Systems 
 Department of Architecture and Environment Systems 
 Department of Bioscience and Engineering 
 Department of Mathematical Sciences
 College of Engineering and Design
 Department of Engineering and Design

Graduate schools 
 Graduate School of Engineering and Science (Master's Program)
 Electrical Engineering and Computer Science 
 Materials Science and Engineering 
 Applied Chemistry 
 Mechanical Engineering 
 Architecture
 Systems Engineering and Science
 Graduate School of Engineering and Science (Doctor's Program)
 Regional Environment Systems 
 Functional Control Systems 
 Graduate School of Engineering Management (Master's Program)
 Engineering Management

Notable people

Staff 

 Leo Esaki, physicist, Nobel Prize winner
 Masataka Ogawa, chemist, known for his discovery of rhenium
 Shigemaru Takenokoshi, footballer, Japan national team manager, football coach
 Masato Murakami, materials scientist

Alumni 

 Hajime Narukawa, architect, inventor of AuthaGraph and professor at Keio University
 Hidetaka Tenjin, anime artist and science fiction illustrator
 Hanako Oku, singer and songwriter
 Masashi Tashiro, television performer and musician
 Atsushi Tamaru, voice actor
 Haruki Ihara, baseball player and coach
 Katsuhiko Chikamori, Olympic handball player
 Ko Nakamura, novelist, winner of the Bungei Prize
 Tomohiko Yamazaki, announcer on the NHK
 Hisashi Sakamaki, President and CEO of Canon Electronics Inc.
 Hiroyuki Nagura, President and CEO of Nippon Filcon
 Dr Nurul Ashikin Mabahwi, President and founder of Malaysian Community in Japan-KMJ (在日マレーシアコミュニティ) , politician

Partner institutions
The Shibaura Institute of Technology has partner agreements with over 150 universities in about 40 countries across all six continents. These include The University of Queensland; Pennsylvania State University; University of California, Irvine; Aalto University; Loughborough University; Korea University; and University of Sao Paulo.

References

External links
 Official website

Educational institutions established in 1927
Private universities and colleges in Japan
Research institutes in Japan
Universities and colleges in Tokyo
Universities and colleges in Saitama Prefecture
Technical universities and colleges in Japan
Engineering universities and colleges in Japan
1927 establishments in Japan